South Asian pickles, also known as avalehikā, pachchadi, achaar (sometimes spelled as aachaar or achar), athaanu, loncha, oorugaai, or aavakaai, is a pickled food made from a variety of vegetables and fruits preserved in brine, vinegar, edible oils, and various South Asian spices. The pickles are popular across the South Asian subcontinent, with many regional variants.

Etymology
Etymology for pickles in South Asia varies regionally. The pickles are known as uppinakaayi in Kannada, avakaya in Telugu, oorugaai in Tamil, uppillittuthu in Malayalam, loncha in Marathi, athanu in Gujarati, and achaar in Hindustani (Hindi-Urdu), Nepali and Bengali. Early Sanskrit and Tamil literature uses the terms avalehika, upadamzam, sandhita, and avaleha for pickles. 

Āchār, a loanword of Persian origin, entered popular use as the Hindustani term for pickles under the Mughal Empire. In Persian, the word āchār is defined as "powdered or salted meats, pickles, or fruits, preserved in salt, vinegar, honey, or syrup".

History
Early pickle recipes in Ayurvedic and Sangam period texts mention several varieties of pickles, including the earliest known mention of mango pickles. Nalachampu, a Sanskrit epic written by Trivikrama Bhatta in 915 CE, describes pickles made from green mango, green peppercorns, long pepper, raw cardamom, lemon, lime, myrobalan, hog plum, stone apple, and fragrant manjack. Early medieval cookbooks such as Lokopakara (1025 CE), Manasollasa (1130 CE), Pakadarpana (1200 CE), and Soopa Shastra (1508 CE), Kshemakutuhala (1549 CE) mentions pickle recipes that use green mango, green peppercorns, longpepper, lemons and limes, turmeric root, mango-ginger root, ginger, radish, bitter gourd, cucumber, lotus root, and bamboo shoots. The religious text Lingapurana by Gurulinga Desika (1594 CE) mentions more than fifty kinds of pickles. Unique pickles made from edible flowers are also mentioned in the Ni'matnama (1500 CE) cookbook. 

Chili peppers were introduced to South Asia by Portuguese traders in ports controlled by the Mughal Empire on the western coast of Gujarat. It is unclear when red chili peppers came to be used in pickles as they are today, since medieval texts do not mention their use in pickles. Before the introduction of chili peppers by the Portuguese, black pepper, long pepper, and Piper chaba (in both fresh and dried forms) were the main source of heat in ancient and medieval pickles.

Ingredients

Chili peppers are the decisive ingredient in South Asian pickles, though other ingredients vary by region within the Indian subcontinent. Some commonly used ingredients are limes, lemons, mangoes, ginger, and eggplants.

In India, there are two main types of pickles: pickles made with sesame or mustard oil, and pickles made without oil. Pickles without oil use salt to draw out the moisture from green mangoes or lemons to create a brine. A mixture of lemon or lime juice with salt or traditional ganne ka sirka (sugarcane vinegar) may also be used as brine. In some pickles from Gujarat and Rajasthan, jaggery is used as the main preserve.

Homemade pickles are prepared in the summer. They are matured through exposure to sunlight for up to two weeks. The pickle is tradtionally covered with muslin while it is maturing.

Regional variations

India

Despite using the same main ingredients, differences in preparation techniques and spices have led to wide variation in Indian pickles. A mango pickle from South India tastes very different from one made in North India, as the southern states prefer sesame oil and tend to produce spicier pickles, while the northern states prefer mustard oil.

The city of Panipat in Haryana is well-known as a hub for commercial achaar, and is particularly famous for pachranga (literally "five colors", prepared with five vegetables) and satranga (literally "seven colors", prepared with seven vegetables). Pachranga and satranga achaar are matured in mustard oil and whole spices with ingredients like raw mangoes, chickpeas, lotus stem, karonda, myrobalan, and limes. Pachranga achaar was first created in 1930 by Murli Dhar Dhingra in Kaloorkot, a village in the Mianwali District of what is now Pakistan. Dhingra's descendants brought the pickle to India in 1943. As of 2016, Panipat produced over  worth of achaar every year, supplied to local markets as well as exported to the UK, US, and Middle East.

In South India, most vegetables are sun-dried with spices, taking advantage of the immensely hot and sunny climate in the region. The sun-drying process naturally preserves the vegetables, along with spices such as mustard, fenugreek seeds, chili powder, salt, asafoetida, and turmeric. To speed up the process, vegetables may be cooked before drying.The states of Telangana and Andhra Pradesh are particularly well-known for their spicy pickles. Unripe mango with garlic and ginger ( in Telugu) and unripe tamarind with green chilies ( in Telugu) and red chillies ( in Telugu) are a staple with everyday meals. Gooseberry ( in Telugu) and lemon ( in Telugu) pickles are widely eaten as well.

In the state of Tamil Nadu, the mango pickle  is a staple condiment.  is usually made early in the summer season, when mangoes are barely an inch long. The preservation process uses castor oil, giving the pickle a unique taste.

In the state of Karnataka, the tender whole mango pickle  is made by dehydrating tender whole mangoes with salt. Appemidi or Appimidi is the mango variety which gives distinct taste to the mango pickle made Also pickles made from Gooseberry (Nelikayi), Hogplum (Ametekayi), Lemon(Nimbekayi or Limbekayi), Karande or Karavanda( Carissa Caranda) is popular. Also Udupi cuisine has unique way of making Indian pickles without any use of edible oil.

South Indians living in the coastal areas also pickle fish and meats. In Tamil Nadu,  is made by salting and sun-drying fish. While fish and shrimp pickles are eaten in Andhra Pradesh and Telangana, they are not as popular as lamb and chicken pickles.

Unripe mangoes, lemon, green chilis,  (Cordia dichotoma), and kerda are commonly used as key ingredients in Gujarati pickles. Common Gujarati pickles include salted mango pickle made with groundnut oil and spiced with fenugreek seeds and red chili powder; hot and sweet mango pickle made with groundnut oil and jaggery, fennel seeds, dry dates, mustard, and red chili powder; and hot and sweet mango pickle made with sugar syrup, cumin, and chili powder.

Myanmar (Burma)
The Burmese word for pickle is thanat. Mango pickle (thayet thi thanat) is the most prevalent variety. The pickle is made with green, ripe, or dried mangoes cured in vinegar, sugar, salt, chili powder, masala, garlic, fresh chilies, and mustard seeds. Mango pickle is commonly used as a condiment alongside curries and biryani in Burmese cuisine. It is also a mainstay ingredient in a traditional Burmese curry called wet thanat hin.

Nepal 

In Nepal, achaar is commonly eaten with the staple Dal-Bhat-Tarkari. Many achaar factories in Nepal are women-owned or operated by women. Nepalese achaar is made with spices such as mustard seeds, timur (Sichuan pepper), cumin powder, coriander powder, turmeric powder, and chili powder. Some of the popular varieties of achar eaten in Nepal are:
 Lapsi achaar - Hog plum pickle (can be sweet, savoury, or both)
 Khalpi achaar - Ripe cucumber preserved with mustard seed, oil, and spices
 Dalle khursani achaar - Nepali round chili pickle
 Tama achaar - Fermented bamboo pickle
 Gundruk achaar - Fermented mustard leaves pickle
 Mula ko achaar - Sun-dried radish and daikon preserved in oil and spices
 Karkalo achaar - Pickled stems of Colocasisa 
 Kinema achaar - Fermented soybean pickle
 Buff achaar - Pickled buffalo meat
 Chicken achaar - Pickled chicken
 Aanp ko achaar - Unripe mango pickle (can be sweet, savoury, or both)
 Kagati ko achaar - Lemon pickle
 Timur ko chop - Powdered Sichuan pepper with spices
 Jhinge machha achaar - Freshwater shrimp pickle

Pakistan
The Sindh province of modern-day Pakistan is noted for Shikrarpuri achaar and Hyderabadi achaar. Both of these achaar varieties are commonly eaten in Pakistan and abroad. Shikrarpuri achaar is believed to have originated during the 1600s in medieval India. The most popular of variety of Shikarpuri achaar is a mixed pickle comprising carrots, turnips, onions, cauliflower, chickpeas, garlic, green chillies, lime, and mango.

Sri Lanka

Pickles are known as acharu in Sinhala or oorugai in Tamil.

Africa
In South Africa and Botswana, Indian pickles are called atchar. They are made primarily from unripe mangoes and are sometimes eaten with bread.

See also

 
 
 .
 , a British variant of South Asian pickle
 , an Israeli/Middle Eastern variant of South Asian pickle

References

Further reading
 

Bangladeshi condiments
Bengali cuisine
Indian condiments
 
Nepalese cuisine
Indo-Caribbean cuisine
Pakistani condiments
 
Pakistani spices
Sindhi cuisine
South African cuisine
Sri Lankan cuisine